Phlaocyon minor is an extinct species of canid mammal known from the Miocene-Oligocene (Arikareean NALMA, more than ) of the United States (Wyoming, South Dakota, Nebraska, Wyoming, and Texas.)

The type specimen of P. minor is a partial maxilla, a partial dentary, and limb fragments found in Oglala Lakota County, South Dakota (: paleocoordinates ).   referred half a dozen other specimens to P. minor, including a nearly complete skull and a mandible from Wyoming.

P. minor is the most basal member of Phlaocyon but it can still be distinguished from more primitive borophagines such as Archaeocyon, Rhizocyon, and Cynarctoides.   Characters placing it in Phlaocyon includes robust and shortened premolars, a quadrate first upper molar, and widened talonid on the first lower molar.  Characters unique to P. minor include the double temporal crests and the elongated lower second molar.

References

Notes

Sources

 
 
 
 
 

Borophagines
Oligocene canids
Miocene canids
Miocene species extinctions
Prehistoric mammals of North America